Neurophyseta mollitalis is a moth in the family Crambidae. It was described by William Schaus in 1912. It is found in Bolivia, Colombia, Costa Rica and Panama.

References

Moths described in 1912
Musotiminae